John J. McCreesh (August 1881 – September 10, 1959) was an American politician from Pennsylvania who served as a Democratic member of the Pennsylvania State Senate for the 4th district from 1935 to 1958. He was born in Armagh County, Ireland now a part of Northern Ireland.  Upon his retirement in 1958, he was succeeded by his son Thomas McCreesh.

References

External links
John McCreesh at the Political Graveyard

1881 births
1959 deaths
20th-century American politicians
Democratic Party Pennsylvania state senators
Politicians from County Armagh
Politicians from Philadelphia
Year of birth uncertain